The 1940 South Sydney Rabbitohs season was the 33rd in the club's history. The club competed in the New South Wales Rugby Football League Premiership (NSWRFL), finishing the season 6th.

Ladder

Fixtures

Player statistics

References 

1940 in Australian rugby league
South Sydney Rabbitohs seasons